The UK Festival Awards are awarded annually, with various categories for all aspects of festivals that have taken place in the UK, and one category for European festivals.  The Awards were first established in 2004 by Steve Jenner and his team at Virtual Festivals.com. They are voted for by the public via the UK Festival Awards website.  To ensure fairness, the votes are weighted to take into account the event capacity.

The 2008 Awards ceremony was held on 30 October 2008 at the IndigO2 venue in London. Nordoff–Robbins music therapy will receive funds raised on the night.

The 2011 Awards ceremony was held at the Roundhouse in Camden, which remained its home until 2016.

Having grown beyond the original team's capacity to manage it as a part-time project, Mondiale Publishing was brought in as an acquiring partner in 2012, with Steve Jenner remaining onboard as a creative consultant.

Since 2017, to bring the Awards into closer alignment with flourishing Independent Festival sector, the UK Festival Awards have been held at Troxy, the music and events venue in Stepney, London.

2004
UK Festival Awards launched as an online poll by VirtualFestivals.com, 12,000 fans vote. The awards are presented in person to the winners in their local pubs of choice

2005
50,000+ fans vote; BBC 6 Music sign up as media partner. Saluted in Scottish Parliament when T in the Park is voted Best Major Festival. The awards are again presented to the winners in person during an epic road-trip spanning the UK.

2006
Pressure from the industry prompts the creation of the first live event, for 500 standing-only at London’s Islington Academy, sponsored by Carling.

Hosted by: Steve Harris. Outstanding Contribution to Festivals: Melvin Benn (Festival Republic – Reading & Leeds, Latitude).

2007
The first "sit down" event at KoKo, Camden. Michael Eavis attends.

Hosted by: the Cuban Brothers. Outstanding Contribution to Festivals: John Giddings (Isle of Wight).

2008
Moves to the IndigO2, adding a gala dinner component (at the Goucho restaurant) and the first UK Festival Conference by day (oversubscribed).

Michael Eavis accepting his Outstanding Contribution to Festivals award at the IndigO2 in 2008. Establishes independent ownership as Festival Awards Ltd.

Hosted by: Shaun Keaveny. Outstanding Contribution to Festivals: Michael Eavis (Glastonbury).

2008 Nominations Shortlist
 Best Major Festival
 Creamfields
 Download
 Glastonbury Festival
 Global Gathering
 Isle of Wight Festival
 Leeds Festival
 Reading Festival
 T in the Park
 V Festival Chelmsford
 V Festival Staffordshire
 Best Medium Sized Festival
 Beautiful Days
 Bestival
 The Glade
 Hydro Connect
 Latitude
 Lovebox Weekender
 RockNess
 The Big Chill
 Wickerman Festival
 Wakestock (Abersoch)
 Best Small Festival
 2000 Trees
 Beach Break Live
 Cambridge Folk Festival
 End Of The Road Festival
 Indie Track Festival
 Larmer Tree Festival
 Secret Garden Party
 Standon Calling
 Strummercamp
 Summer Sundae Weekender
 Best Dance Festival
 Creamfields
 Dance Island
 Escape Into The Park
 The Glade
 Global Gathering
 Run To The Sun Festival
 South West Four
 Waveform Festival
 Best Lineup
 Bestival
 End of the Road Festival
 Glastonbury Festival
 Isle of Wight Festival
 Latitude
 Lovebox Weekender
 Reading Festival
 T in the Park
 The Big Chill
 V Festival Chelmsford
 Best New Festival
 Beachdown Festival
 Bearded Theory
 Camp Bestival
 Festibelly
 Hop Farm Festival
 Offset Festival
 The Limetree Festival
 The Magic Loungeabout
 The Mighty Boosh Festival
 Wakestock (Blenheim Palace)
 Grass Roots Festival
 Beautiful Days
 Belladrum Tartan Heart Festival
 Big Session
 End Of The Road Festival
 Kendal Calling
 Knockengorroach – World Ceilidh
 Loopallu
 Off The Tracks
 Wickerman Festival
 WOMAD
 Family Festival Award
 Beautiful Days
 Camp Bestival
 Fairport's Cropredy Convention
 Greenbelt
 GuilFest
 Larmer Tree Festival
 Solfest
 Summer Sundae Weekender
 Weyfest
 Wychwood Festival
 Best Toilets
 Aeon Festival
 Festinho
 Greenbelt
 Larmer Tree Festival
 Nozstock
 Secret Garden Party
 Standon Calling
 Strummercamp
 The Big Chill
 Y Not Festival
 Best European Festival
 Castlepalooza (Ireland)
 Creamfields Romania (Romania)
 EXIT (Serbia)
 Festival dello Stretto (Italy)
 FIB Benicassim (Spain)
 Gurtenfestival (Switzerland)
 Heineken Open-er (Poland)
 HOVE Festivalen (Norway)
 Lowlands (Netherlands)
 Open Air St. Gallen (Switzerland)
 Oxegen (Ireland)
 Roskilde (Denmark)
 Snowbombing (Austria)
 Spirit of Burgas (Bulgaria)
 Tignes Fest (France)
 Festival Headline Act
 Kings of Leon
 Metallica
 Muse
 Rage Against the Machine
 The Verve
 Festival Rock Act
 Biffy Clyro
 Bloc Party
 Bullet for My Valentine
 Elbow
 The Raconteurs
 Festival Dance Act
 Groove Armada
 Hot Chip
 Pendulum
 The Chemical Brothers
 The Prodigy
 Festival Pop Act
 Duffy
 Girls Aloud
 Scouting for Girls
 The Ting Tings
 Will Young
 Festival Feel-Good Act
 Eddy Grant
 Neil Diamond
 Seasick Steve
 Tenacious D
 The Mighty Boosh
 Festival Urban Act
 Dizzee Rascal
 Estelle
 N*E*R*D
 Roots Manuva
 The Streets
 Best Live Newcomer
 Duffy
 Glasvegas
 MGMT
 The Ting Tings
 Vampire Weekend
 Anthem Of The Summer
 Dizzee Rascal featuring Calvin Harris - Dance wiv Me
 MGMT - Time to Pretend
 Noah and the Whale - 5 Years Time
 The Ting Tings - That's Not My Name
 The Verve - Love Is Noise
 Innovation Award
 Beachdown: All shuttle-buses and official transportation ran on used cooking oil.
 Glade Festival: Ticket scheme whereby festival goers were pre-sent an access card to swipe at the gate.
 Glastonbury Festival: Biodegradable, starch tent pegs handed out to festival goers.
 Hydro Connect: Rickshaws used to ferry festival goers and artists around the site.
Isle of Wight Festival: Wristbands distributed two weeks before the festival to speed up entry.
 Latitude: Theatre Arena built upon the world's first fuel cell powered festival stage.
 Lovebox Weekender: Real-time webcasts of artist interviews and performances on website and stage screens.
 Solfest: Kids only toilets introduced to make things easier for children and adults alike.
 Standon Calling: Hosted the UK's first festival underwater dance arena in a swimming pool.
 The Big Chill: Big Issue vendors sold the programme on site, while buskers were invited to perform.
 Most Memorable Moment
 British Sea Power, Arctic Monkeys and Klaxons hold impromptu collaboration at Sing Ye From The Hills.
 Edwyn Collins makes moving comeback at Glastonbury following life-threatening illness.
 Jay-Z mocks Noel Gallagher with his rendition of Wonderwall at Glastonbury.
 Kasabian play up to dance fans with a cover of The Source's You Got the Love at Creamfields.
 KISS spit blood and 'fly over' Download fans, as thousands dress up as Gene Simmons.
 Robert Plant joins Fairport Convention on stage at Cropredy Festival for Battle Of Evermore
 Ross Noble leads a conga around the Latitude site, stealing fans from various stages
 Secret Garden Party blow up their lake-marooned Pirate Ship in a firework spectacular.
 The Specials and Grace Jones play secret back-to-back gigs at Bestival
 Utah Saints break world record for most ever fans doing the 'Running Man' dance at Get Loaded In The Park.

2009
The Awards returns to the O2 and the conference fills out into Europe’s largest cinema, the Vue in the O2 complex. The European Festival Awards is launched in partnership with The European Festival Association and debuts at The Grand Theatre in Groningen, Holland, on the opening night of Eurosonic Noorderslag.

Hosted by: Dixie and Horsey (Stars of ‘Svengali’). Lifetime Achievement Winner: Katrina Larkin (The Big Chill).

2010
The Awards continues its O2 residency and the Conference expands again into sell-out event at the British Music Experience, covered live by BBC Business News.

2010 Winners
 Best Toilets - T In The Park
 Best Metropolitan Festival - Gaymers Camden Crawl
 Best Family Festival in association with Showsec - Camp Bestival
 Best Breakthrough Artist in association with Rizla - Mumford & Sons
 Best Dance Event in association with Peppermint Bars - Creamfields
 Feel Good Act of the Summer in association with Be-at TV - Paolo Nutini
 Best New Festival in association with Access All Areas - Vintage At Goodwood
 Headline Performance of the Year in association with Jägermeister - AC/DC at Download Festival
 Virtual Festivals’ Critics Choice - Biffy Clyro at Glastonbury
 Overseas Festival - Snowbombing
 Anthem of the Summer in association with HMV - Florence & The Machine ‘You’ve Got The Love’
 Line-Up of the Year* in association with XL Video - Rockness
 Promoter of the Year in association with IQ - Glastonbury
 Best Small Festival in association with Doodson Entertainment - Kendal Calling
 Best Medium Festival in association with Smirnoff Flavours - Green Man
 Best Major Festival in association with Tuborg - Bestival
 Lifetime Achievement in association with Music Week – Geoff Ellis, DF Concerts
 Outstanding Contribution to Festival Production in association with TPi - Neil McDonald
 Best Sponsor Activation in association with Brand Republic - Coca-Cola
 The Grass Roots Festival Award in association with Robertson Taylor - 2000 Trees
 A Greener Festival Award in association with agreenerfestival.com - Croissant Neuf Summer Party

Hosted by: Craig Charles. Lifetime Achievement Winner: Geoff Ellis (T in the Park).

2011
Awards show up-scales to The Roundhouse and sells-out – the founding dream realised. Conference moves up to The Forum, attracts record attendance.

Hosted by: The Cuban Brothers. Lifetime Achievement Winner: Steve Heap (Association of Folk Festivals).

http://www.festivalawards.com/2011-winners/

Best New Festival

Wilderness

Best Metropolitan Festival

Tramlines

Best Dance Event

Creamfields

Best Overseas Festival

Outlook (Croatia)

Best Family Festival

Beautiful Days

Best Breakthrough Artist

Ed Sheeran

Line-Up of the Year

Sonisphere Knebworth

Headline Performance of the Year

Paolo Nutini at Latitude

Anthem Of The Summer

Chase and Status: Blind Faith

Agent Of The Year

Steve Strange

Promoter Of The Year

Secret Productions

Best Small Festival

End of the Road

Best Medium-Sized Festival

Secret Garden Party

Best Major Festival

Glastonbury

Fans' Favourite Festival

Bestival

Lifetime Achievement Award

Steve Heap, Mrs Casey Music / Towersey Village Festival

PRESENTED AT THE UK FESTIVAL CONFERENCE:

Earlier in the day at The Forum, Kentish Town…

The Grass Roots Festival Award

Y-Not Festival

Concession Of The Year

The Beat Hotel

The Greener Festival Award

Shambala

Best Toilets

Y-Not Festival

Best Sponsor Activation

Capitalize: Bacardi

The Extra-Festival Activity Award

Bearded Kitten

Outstanding Contribution to Festival Production

The Event Safety Shop

2012
Mondiale Publishing acquires a majority stake in the Awards which returns to The Roundhouse. Conference joins it at the same venue for the first time.

Hosted by: Phill Jupitus.

http://www.festivalawards.com/2012-winners/

Best New Festival

Festival Number 6

Best Metropolitan Festival

Camden Crawl

Best Dance Event

Global Gathering

Best Overseas Festival

Benicassim (Spain)

Best Family Festival

Latitude

Best Breakthrough Act

Jake Bugg

Line-Up of the Year

Download

Headline Performance of the Year

New Order at Festival Number 6

Anthem Of The Summer

Django Django – ‘Default’

Agency Of The Year

William Morris

Promoter Of The Year

Gareth Cooper (Festival Number 6, Beach Break Live, Lollibop, Snowbombing, Lounge On The Farm)

Best Small Festival

Y-Not

Best Medium-Sized Festival

Bloodstock Open-Air

Best Major Festival

Bestival

The Grass Roots Festival Award

Green Man

The Greener Festival Award

Croissant Neuf Summer Party

Concession Of The Year

Paelleria

Best Toilets

Lodestar

Best Brand Activation

The Southern Comfort Juke-Joint

The Extra-Festival Activity Award

Live From Jodrell Bank

Lifetime Achievement Award

John Probyn, Chief Operating Officer, Live Nation

2013
Awards returns to The Roundhouse.

http://www.festivalawards.com/2013-winners/

BEST MAJOR FESTIVAL

Download

MEDIUM-SIZED FESTIVAL

Kendal Calling

BEST SMALL FESTIVAL

Bearded Theory

BEST NEW FESTIVAL

We Are FSTVL

BEST DANCE EVENT

Creamfields

BEST METROPOLITAN FESTIVAL

Dot To Dot

BEST FAMILY FESTIVAL

Camp Bestival

BEST GRASSROOTS EVENT

2000trees Festival

BEST TOILETS

ArcTanGent

BEST OVERSEAS FESTIVAL

Snowbombing (Austria)

HEADLINE PERFORMANCE OF THE YEAR

Arctic Monkeys – Glastonbury

ANTHEM OF THE SUMMER

Get Lucky – Daft Punk

BREAKTHROUGH ACT OF THE YEAR

Rudimental

Jury-decided Categories:

AGENT OF THE YEAR

CODA

BEST LINE-UP

Latitude

CONCESSION OF THE YEAR

Strumpets with Crumpets

THE GREENER FESTIVAL AWARD

Shambala Festival

BEST BRAND ACTIVATION

Virgin Media

THE EXTRA-FESTIVAL ACTIVITY AWARD

Wilderness

PROMOTER OF THE YEAR

Paddy Glasgow (Glasgowbury)

BEST USE OF NEW TECHNOLOGY

Barclaycard Presents British Summer Time (in Hyde Park) Intelligent Venue Solutions

THE OUTSTANDING ACHIEVEMENT AWARD

Fiona Stewart, Green Man Festival

2016
Awards returns to The Roundhouse.

2016 Finalists Shortlist
 Best Major Festival
 British Summertime Hyde Park
 Creamfields
 Download Festival
 Electric Daisy Carnival UK
 Glastonbury Festival
 Isle of Wight Festival
 Reading & Leeds Festival
 V Festival
 Victorious Festival
 Wireless Festival
 Best Medium-Sized Festival
 Bestival
 Beautiful Days
 Bloodstock Open Air
 Camp Bestival
 Green Man Festival
 Kendal Calling
 Love Supreme Jazz Festival
 The Social Festival
 We Are FSTVL
 Y Not Festival
 Best Small Festival
 3 Wishes Faery Fest
 Acoustic Sundays Summer Sessions
 Bearded Theory
 Beats Cancer Music Festival
 Breaking Bands Festival
 Liverpool Music Week
 Mammothfest
 Northbridge Festival
 The Secret Festival
 Wildfire Adventure Camp

Best New Festival
 2Q Festival
 A New Day Festival
 Afropunk London
 Big Family Festival
 Bluedot
 Joy Festival
 Killin Music Festival
 Neighbourhood Festival
 OnRoundhay Festival
 Positive Vibration – Festival of Reggae
 Samphire Festival
 The Bolton Weekender
 Best Dance Event
 Beat Herder
 Bluedot
 Creamfields
 Farr Festival
 Field Maneuvers
 Field Trip
 Gottwood Festival
 HogSozzle Music Festival
 Junction 2
 Nozstock: The Hidden Valley
 The Social Festival
 We Are FSTVL
 Best Metropolitan Festival
 2Q Festival
 Blackpool Music Festival
 Cheltenham Jazz Festival
 Dot to Dot Festival
 Grillstock
 Just for Laughs London
 Live at Leeds Festival
 Liverpool Music Week
 Liverpool Sound City
 Mammothfest
 Stockton Calling
 Tramlines Festival
 Best Family Festival
 3 Wishes Faery Fest
 Bearded Theory
 Beermageddon
 Big Family Festival
 Camp Bestival
 Green Man Festival
 Just So Festival
 Kendal Calling
 Nozstock: The Hidden Valley
 Something To Smile About
 The Good Life Experience
 The Secret Festival
 The Grass Roots Festival Award
 2000Trees
 Balter Festival
 Barn on the Farm
 Beermageddon
 Bloodstock Open Air
 Green Man Festival
 LeeFest Presents The Neverland
 Lindisfarne Festival
 New Forest Folk Festival
 Samphire Festival
 The Secret Festival
 Wildfire Adventure Camp
 Headline Performance of the Year
 American Football at ArcTanGent
 Andy C at NASS
 Calvin Harris at Creamfields
 Elton John at Henley Festival
 The Flaming Lips at Wilderness
 Jean-Michel Jarre at Bluedot
 LCD Soundsystem at Lovebox
 Massive Attack at British Summertime Hyde Park
 Refused at 2000Trees
 Rihanna at V Festival
 Line-Up of the Year
 ArcTanGent
 Bloc
 British Summertime Hyde Park
 End of the Road Festival
 Green Man Festival
 Liverpool Music Week
 Simple Things Festival
 Slam Dunk Festival
 The Social Festival
 WOMAD
 Best Overseas Festival
 Altitude Comedy Festival
 Bestival Toronto
 Blues in Hell
 Castlepalooza
 Dimensions Festival
 Download Paris
 Electric Elephant
 EXIT Festival
 Hideout Festival
 Gibraltar World Music Festival
 Snowbombing
 SXM Festival

References

External links 
 UK Festival Awards home page
 About SW4 and Lineup 2013 (in Russian)

Awards established in 2004
British music awards
2004 establishments in the United Kingdom
Festivals in the United Kingdom
Annual events in the United Kingdom